"L'ultimo addio" is a song by Italian singer Annalisa. It was written by Annalisa, Diego Calvetti and Francesco Sighieri, and produced by Calvetti and Kekko Silvestre.

It was released by Warner Music Italy on 19 September 2014 as the second single of her fourth studio album Splende. The song peaked at number 27 on the FIMI Singles Chart and was certified gold in Italy.

Music video
A music video to accompany the release of "L'ultimo addio" was released onto YouTube on 7 October 2014. It was directed by Gaetano Morbioli and shot in Varigotti, Liguria.

Track listing

Charts

Certifications

References

2014 singles
2014 songs
Annalisa songs
Songs written by Annalisa
Songs written by Diego Calvetti